Musy is a French surname. Notable people with the surname include:

 Benoît Musy (1917–1956), Swiss motorcycle racer
 Enrico Musy (1901–1966), Italian actor
 Gianni Musy (1931–2011), Italian actor and voice actor
 Jean-Marie Musy (1876–1952), Swiss politician
 Louis Musy (1902–1981), French opera singer and stage director
 Pierre Musy (1910–1990), Swiss bobsledder

See also
 Mussy (disambiguation)
 Musi (disambiguation)

French-language surnames